Grigori Samuilovitsch Tseitin (born November 15, 1936 in Leningrad, USSR, deceased August 27, 2022 in Campbell, CA, USA) was a Russian mathematician and computer scientist, who moved to the United States in 1999. He is best known for Tseitin transformation used in SAT solvers, Tseitin tautologies used in the proof complexity theory, and for his work on Algol 68.

Biography 
Tseitin studied Mathematics at the Leningrad State University (now Saint Petersburg State University) in 1951-1956. He earned his PhD in 1960 with "Algorithmic Operators on Constructive Complete Separable Metric Spaces“. In 1968, he received the Russian doctoral degree (corresponding to a habilitation) from the same university . From 1960 to 2000 Tseitin worked at the Smirnov Scientific Research Institute of Mathematics and Mechanics and taught classes in computer science at his alma mater.

In 2006, Tseitin was recognized as a Distinguished Scientist by the ACM.

Works 
 G. S. Tseitin. „On the complexity of derivation in propositional calculus“ in: J. Siekmann and G. Wrightson, editors, Automation of Reasoning 2: Classical Papers on Computational Logic 1967–1970, S. 466–483. Berlin, Heidelberg, 1983.

Weblinks

References 

20th-century Russian  mathematicians
21st-century  Russian  mathematicians
Russian computer scientists
1936 births

Living people